Winnie Davis Hall, built in 1904, is an historic redbrick college building on the campus of Limestone College in Gaffney, South Carolina. It was designed by Darlington native William Augustus Edwards, who designed academic buildings at 12 institutions of higher learning as well as 13 courthouses and numerous other buildings in Florida, Georgia and South Carolina. It was named for Varina "Winnie" Anne Davis, the daughter of Jefferson Davis and was built to serve as a repository for American Civil War papers as a center for the study of Southern history. On April 29, 1977, it was added to the National Register of Historic Places. It is part of the Limestone Springs Historic District and is also known as the Winnie Davis Hall of History.

See also

List of Registered Historic Places in South Carolina

References

External links 
 National Register listings for Cherokee County
 South Carolina Department of Archives and History file on Winnie Davis Hall
 University of Florida biography of William Augustus Edwards
 

School buildings on the National Register of Historic Places in South Carolina
William Augustus Edwards buildings
Buildings and structures in Cherokee County, South Carolina
Gaffney, South Carolina
National Register of Historic Places in Cherokee County, South Carolina
School buildings completed in 1904
Limestone University
1904 establishments in South Carolina